Furletti is an Italian surname. Notable people with the surname include:

 Carlo Furletti (born 1945), Australian politician
 Carmine Furletti (1926–2008), Brazilian football administrator
 Alicia Furletti-Blomberg 

Italian-language surnames